In number theory, an evil number is a non-negative integer that has an even number of 1s in its binary expansion. These numbers give the positions of the zero values in the Thue–Morse sequence, and for this reason they have also been called the Thue–Morse set. Non-negative integers that are not evil are called odious numbers.

Examples
The first evil numbers are:

0, 3, 5, 6, 9, 10, 12, 15, 17, 18, 20, 23, 24, 27, 29, 30, 33, 34, 36, 39 ...

Equal sums
The partition of the non-negative integers into the odious and evil numbers is the unique partition of these numbers into two sets that have equal multisets of pairwise sums.

In computer science
In computer science, an evil number is said to have even parity.

References

Integer sequences